Henry is a masculine given name derived from Old French Henri / Henry, itself derived from the Old Frankish name Heimeric, from Common Germanic  *Haimarīks (from *haima- "home" and *rīk- "ruler"). In Old High German, the name was conflated with the name Haginrich (from hagin "enclosure" and rich "ruler") to form Heinrich.

The Old High German name is recorded from the 8th century, in the variants Haimirich, Haimerich, Heimerich, Hemirih. Harry, its English short form, was considered the "spoken form" of Henry in medieval England. Most English kings named Henry were called Harry. The name became so popular in England that the phrase "Tom, Dick, and Harry" began to be used to refer to men in general. The common English feminine forms of the name are Harriet and Henrietta. A Italian variant descended from the Old High German name, Amerigo, was the source from which the continents of the Americas were named.

It has been a consistently popular name in English-speaking countries for centuries. It was among the top 100 most popular names used for men born in the United States, England and Wales, and in Australia in 2007. It was the 46th most common name for boys and men in the United States in the 1990 census. And has ranked among the ten most popular names for American newborn boys in 2020. Henry was among the five most popular names for White newborn boys and newborn boys of Asian descent in the American state of Virginia in 2022.  Harry, its short form, was the fifth most popular name for boys in England and Wales in 2007 and among the top 50 names in Ireland, Scotland and Northern Ireland in recent years. Harry was ranked as the 578th most popular name in the United States in 2007. It is also in use as a surname.

Masculine variants
In the High Middle Ages, the name was Latinized as Henricus. It was a royal name in Germany, France and England throughout the high medieval period (Henry I of Germany, Henry I of England, Henry I of France) and widely used as a given name; as a consequence, many regional variants developed in the languages of Western and Central Europe:

Within German, Low German, Frisian and Dutch, numerous diminutives and abbreviated forms exist, including Low German, Dutch and Frisian Heike, Heiko; Dutch Hein, Heintje; German Heiner, Heinz.

The original diphthong was lost in Dutch  Hendrik (hypocoristics  Henk, Hennie, Rik), Scandinavian Henrik (whence Henning).

Eastern European languages have developed native forms during the medieval period under the influence of German and the Scandinavian languages, hence Polish Henryk, Czech Jindřich, Hynek.
Hungarian, Slovene, Croatian Henrik, Finnish Henrikki (hypocoristic Heikki), and Lithuanian Henrikas or Herkus.

The Old French form Henri / Middle French Henry became productive in the British Isles, in Middle English adopted as Harry, Herry. Herry was adopted into Welsh as Perry, into Irish as Annraoi, Anraí, Einrí and into Scottish Gaelic as Eanraig, Eanruig.

In Southern Europe variants without the initial H- include Italian Arrigo, Enrico, Catalan / Occitan Enric and Spanish Enrique (whence Basque Endika) and Italian Enzo.

A separate variant, which may originate with the Old High German name Haimirich, but possibly conflated with
the names Ermenrich (first element ermen "whole") or Amalric (first element amal "vigour, bravery") is Emmerich. Emmerich is the origin of a separate suit of variant names used across Western and Central Europe, although these never rose to the ubiquity of the variants of Henry; they include English Emery, Amery, Emory, French Émeric / Aymeric, Hungarian Imre, Imrus, Slovak Imrich, Italian Amerigo and Iberian (Portuguese, Spanish, Galician) Américo, etc. Hendick

Feminine variants
Several variants of Heinrich have given rise to derived feminine given names.
Low German Henrik, Hendrik gave rise to Henrike, Hendrike, Hendrikje, Hendrina, Henrika and others, Low German Heiko to Heike, Italian Enrico gave rise to Enrica, Spanish Enrique to Enriqueta, Enriquetta, Enriquette. French Henri gave rise to Henriette, Henrietta, further modified to Enrieta, Enrietta, English Harry to Harriet, Harriett, Harrietta, Harriette, hypocorisms Hattie, Hatty, Hettie, Etta, Ettie; various other hypocorisms include Hena, Henna, Henah, Heni, Henia, Henny, Henya, Henka, Dutch Jet, Jett, Jetta, Jette, Ina. In Polish Henryka, Henia, Heniusia, Henka, Henryczka, Henrysia, Rysia are attested. The hypocorisms Rika, Rike etc. may be from this or other names with the second element -ric. Spanish and Portuguese América from the Emmerich variant Amérigo .

Surnames
Harrison (surname), Henson (surname), Harris (surname), Heaney (Irish surname), Fitzhenry (Irish Hiberno-Norman surname), Heinz (German surname), Enríquez (Spanish surname), Henriques (Portuguese surname), Heney, Henney, 
Hendrick,
Hendricks,
Hinrichs,
Hendrickx,
Hendriks,
Hendrikx,
Hendrix,
Hendryx.

In different languages
Albanian: Enrik, Henri
Arabic: هنري (Hinri)
Afrikaans: Hendrik
Alemmanic: Hene, Heini, Heiri
Amharic: ሄንሪ (Hēnirī)
Armenian: Հենրի (Henri)
Basque: Endika
Bavarian: Heini, Heiner
Belarusian: Henryk
Breton: Herri
Bulgarian: Хенри (Henri)
Catalan: Enric
Chinese (Mandarin): 亨利 (Hēnglì)
Croatian: Henri, Henrik
Czech: Jindra, Jindřich
Danish: Henry, Henrik
Dutch: Henry, Henri, Henrik, Hendrik
Estonian: Heiki, Hindrek, Indrek, Henri, Henrai, Henraiv, Raivo
Faroese: Heindrikur, Heinrikur
Finnish: Henri, Henrik, Heikki
French: Henri, Henry
Frisian: Hindrik
Galician: Henrique, Enrique
Georgian: ჰენრი (Henri), ანრი (Anri)
German: Heinrich, Henrich, Hinrich, Henrick, Heinz
Greek: Ερρίκος (Errikos)
Hawaiian: Hanalē, Henelē
Hebrew: הנרי (Henri)
Hungarian: Henrik
Icelandic: Hinrik, Henrý
Irish: Hanraí, Hamhrí, Anraí, Éinrí
Italian: Enrico, Arrigo
Japanese: ヘンリー (Henrī)
Korean: 헨리 (Henli)
Latin: Henricus
Latvian: Henrijs, Henriks, Heinrihs, Henrihs, Hinrihs, Indriķis, Inds, Ints, Ingus, Inguss, Anrijs, Anrī
Lithuanian: Henris, Henrikas
Macedonian: Хенри (Henri)
Māori: Henare
Norwegian: Henry, Henrik
Northern Sami: Heandarat
Polish: Henryk
Portuguese: Henrique
Romanian: Henric
Russian: Генри (Genri), Генрих (Genrikh), Хенри (Henri), Хенрик (Henrik)
Samoan: Enele
Scottish Gaelic: Eanraig
Serbian: Хенри (Henri)
Slovak: Henrich
Slovene: Henrik
Spanish: Enrique
Swedish: Henry, Henrik, Henrick
Tongan: Heneli
Ukrainian: Генріх (Henrikh)
Vietnamese: Hải Lý
Welsh: Henry, Harri, Herri

People with the given name

Royalty
Kings of England 
Henry I of England 
Henry II of England 
Henry III of England
Henry IV of England, one of the principal commanders of Hundred Years' War 
Henry V of England, one of the principal commanders of Battle of Agincourt 
Henry VI of England 
Henry VII of England, one of the principal commanders Battle of Bosworth Field and Wars of the Roses 
Henry VIII of England, one of the principal commanders of Italian War of 1542–1546 and Rough Wooing, principal leader of Dissolution of the monasteries
 
Junior King of England
Henry the Young King
 
Kings of Germany
Henry the Fowler (876–936)
Henry II, Holy Roman Emperor 
Henry III, Holy Roman Emperor 
Henry IV, Holy Roman Emperor 
Henry V, Holy Roman Emperor
Henry VI, Holy Roman Emperor
Henry VII, Holy Roman Emperor

Kings of France
Henry I of France, one of the principal commanders of Battle of Mortemer and Battle of Val-ès-Dunes
Henry II of France, one of the principal commanders of Italian War of 1551–1559 and Anglo-French War (1557–1559)

Kings of Castile 
Henry I of Castile
Henry II of Castile, one of the principal commanders of Battle of Nájera and Battle of Montiel 
Henry III of Castile, one of the principal commanders of Battle of Collejares 
Henry IV of Castile, one of the principal commanders of Second Battle of Olmedo

King of Portugal
Henry, King of Portugal, king of Portugal and a cardinal of the Catholic Church

Byzantine Emperor
Henry of Flanders, Byzantine emperor, one of the principal commanders of Bulgarian–Latin wars, Battle of Philippopolis (1208) and Battle of the Rhyndacus (1211)

Others 
Prince Harry (born 1984; formally Prince Henry, Duke of Sussex), British prince and military officer
Henry I the Bearded (c. 1165/70 – 19 March 1238), High Duke of Poland
Henry VII (died 1313), Holy Roman Emperor
Henry II the Pious, Duke of Silesia at Wrocław and Duke of Kraków, High Duke of all Poland, and Duke of Southern Greater Poland
Henry Stuart, Lord Darnley (1545–1567), king consort of Scotland
Henry Frederick, Prince of Wales (1594–1612)
Frederick Henry, Prince of Orange (1584–1647), Stadtholder of Holland, one of the principal commanders of the Dutch Revolt
Henry Julius, Duke of Brunswick-Lüneburg (1564–1614)
Prince Henry, Duke of Gloucester, third son and fourth child of King George V and Queen Mary, served as Governor-General of Australia from 1945 to 1947
Henry (son of Edward I) 
Henry, Duke of Villena, Grand Master of the Order of Santiago 
Henry the Lion, Duke of Saxony and Duke of Bavaria, one of the principal commanders of the Second Crusade, Wendish Crusade, and Battle of Verchen

Religious figures
Henry Bretislaus, member of the Přemyslid dynasty, Bishop of Prague from 1182, then Duke of Bohemia as "Bretislaus III"
Henry Compton, Bishop of London during the Glorious Revolution
Henry Oldenburg, German theologian, diplomat, natural philosopher, and creator of scientific peer review, one of the foremost intelligencers of Europe of the seventeenth century
Henry Zdik, Bishop of Olomouc, one of the principal commanders of the Wendish Crusade

Nobility
Henry de Audley (1175–1246), English baron
Henry Bathurst, 3rd Earl Bathurst (1762–1834)
Henry de Bohun, medieval knight killed by King Robert I of Scotland
Henry Borwin II, Lord of Mecklenburg
Henry Brooke, 11th Baron Cobham
Henry Bulwer, 1st Baron Dalling and Bulwer
Henry Carey, 1st Baron Hunsdon (1526–1596)
Henry Dandolo (1107–1205), 41st Doge of Venice, one of the principal commanders of the Fourth Crusade, Battle of Adrianople (1205), Sack of Constantinople, Siege of Constantinople (1203) and Byzantine–Venetian war of 1171
Henry of Grosmont, 1st Duke of Lancaster (c. 1310–1361), member of the English royal family, diplomat, politician, and soldier, one of the principal commanders of the Hundred Years' War (1337–1360), Battle of Bergerac, Battle of Auberoche and Lancaster's chevauchée of 1346
Henry Hardinge, 1st Viscount Hardinge (1785–1856), British Army officer and politician
Henry Hotspur Percy, late-medieval English nobleman, one of the principal commanders of the Battle of Homildon Hill, Battle of Otterburn and Battle of Shrewsbury
Henry Pierrepont, 1st Marquess of Dorchester
Henry Mordaunt, 2nd Earl of Peterborough
Henry de Nassau, Lord Overkirk, Dutch nobleman and military general
Henry Wriothesley, 3rd Earl of Southampton (1573–1624)

Presidents and prime ministers
Herbert Henry Asquith, Prime minister of Great Britain, one of the principal commanders of World War I 
Henry Campbell-Bannerman, British statesman and Liberal Party politician who served as Prime Minister of the United Kingdom
Henry Pelham, British Whig statesman, who served as Prime Minister of Great Britain from 1743 until his death, one of the principal commanders of the War of the Austrian Succession and War of Jenkins' Ear
Henry John Temple, 3rd Viscount Palmerston, British statesman who served twice as Prime Minister in the mid-19th century, one of the principal commanders of Crimean War
Henry A. Wallace, American politician, journalist, and farmer who served as the 33rd Vice President of the United States, the 11th United States Secretary of Agriculture and the 10th United States Secretary of Commerce

Wartime figures and military leaders
Henry Athukorale (1930-2019), Sri Lankan Sinhala army officer
Henry Bagenal (c. 1556–1598), marshal of the Royal Irish Army, one of the principal commanders of the Irish Nine Years' War and Battle of the Yellow Ford
Henry Washington Benham, American general and civil engineer, one of the principal commanders of Battle of Secessionville
Henry "Harry" Chauvel, senior officer of the Australian Imperial Force during World War I, one of the principal commanders of Sinai and Palestine campaign, Battle of Romani, Battle of Magdhaba, Battle of Beersheba (1917), Battle of Sharon, Capture of Damascus and Pursuit to Haritan
Henry Clay Jr., American politician and soldier from Kentucky, one of the principal commanders of Mexican-American War and Battle of Buena Vista
Henry Crerar, senior officer of the Canadian Army who became the country's "leading field commander" in World War II, where he commanded the First Canadian Army, one of the principal commanders of the Battle of the Scheldt
Henry Docwra, 1st Baron Docwra of Culmore, English-born soldier and statesman in 17th-century Ireland, founder of the city of Derry, one of the principal commanders of the Irish Nine Years' War
Henry Every (born c. 1653), British pirate
Henry Gurney, British colonial administrator, one of the principal commanders of the Malayan Emergency
Henry Ruhl Guss (1825-1907), Union Army brevet Major General
Henry Hawley, British army officer who served in the wars of the first half of the 18th century, one of the principal commanders of the Battle of Falkirk Muir and Jacobite rising of 1745
Henry Kent Hewitt, United States Navy commander of amphibious operations in north Africa and southern Europe through World War II, one of the principal commanders of Operation Torch, Naval Battle of Casablanca, Battle of Gela (1943) and Operation Dragoon
Roscoe Henry Hillenkoetter, third director of the post–World War II United States Central Intelligence Group (CIG), the third Director of Central Intelligence (DCI), and the first director of the Central Intelligence Agency created by the National Security Act of 1947
Henry Horne, 1st Baron Horne (1861–1929), British military officer during World War I, one of the principal commanders of the Battle of Arras (1917) and Battle of Cambrai (1918) 
Henry Jackson, Royal Navy officer, one of the principal commanders of the U-boat Campaign (World War I)
Henry Kissinger (born 1923), German-born American politician, one of the principal commanders of Operation Freedom Deal and Cambodian Civil War 
Henry Louis Larsen (1890–1962), United States Marine Corps general, Governor of American Samoa and Governor of Guam
Henry Leach, British Royal Army officer, one of the principal commanders of Falklands War
Henry Lukin, South African military commander
Henry Perera (1930–2009), admiral and Commander of the Sri Lanka Navy from 1979 to 1983
Henry Rathbone (1837–1911), American military officer and diplomat present during the assassination of Abraham Lincoln
Henry Rawlinson, 1st Baron Rawlinson (1864–1925), British General, commander of British Indian Army, one of the principal commanders of Battle of Rooiwal, Battle of Amiens (1918), Battle of the Somme, Second Battle of the Somme and Battle of St Quentin Canal
Henry Jenner Scobell, British military leader who served as the last officer in command of Cape Colony before the formation of the Union of South Africa, one of the principal commanders of the Battle of Groenkloof
William Henry Hudson Southerland (1852–1933), American rear admiral, one of the principal commanders of the United States occupation of Nicaragua
Henry Tandey, English soldier, most highly decorated private of World War I who supposedly spared Adolf Hitler's life during the war, recipient of the Victoria Cross for actions during the First World War
Henry Hugh Tudor, British soldier and officer during the Second Boer War and First World War, one of the principal commanders of the Irish War of Independence
 Sir Henry Wells, a senior officer in the Australian Army, Chief of the General Staff from 1954 to 1958, one of the principal commanders of the Malayan Emergency
Henry Tingle Wilde (1872–1912), chief officer of the RMS Titanic
Henry Williams, leader of the Church Missionary Society (CMS) mission in New Zealand in the first half of the 19th century and during the Flagstaff War
Sir Henry Wilson, 1st Baronet (1864–1922), senior British Army staff officer during the First World War and Irish unionist politician
Henry Maitland Wilson, senior British Army officer of the 20th century, one of the principal commanders of Mediterranean and Middle East theatre of World War II, Balkans campaign (World War II), Battle of Greece and Operation Compass
Henry Wirz, Swiss-American officer of the Confederate States Army and a convicted war criminal, the commandant of the stockade of Camp Sumter concentration camp

Politicians
Henry Abeywickrema (1905–1976), Sri Lankan Cabinet minister
Henry Addington, 1st Viscount Sidmouth (1757–1844), British statesman and Prime Minister of United Kingdom, one of the principal commanders of the French Revolutionary Wars
Henry Woodward Amarasuriya (1904–1981), Sri Lankan Cabinet minister, founding member of the United National Party, educationist, philanthropist, and plantation owner
Henry Bathurst, 3rd Earl Bathurst, British politician and Secretary of State for Foreign and Commonwealth Affairs
Henry Bertram Price, Governor of Guam
Henry Givens Burgess, Irish railway executive and politician
Henry Francis Bryan (1865–1944), 17th Governor of American Samoa
Henry Clay (1777–1852), American statesman, politician, war hawk, presidential candidate, and founder of the Whig Party
Henry De Mel (1877-1936), Sri Lankan Sinhala industrialist, lawyer, philanthropist, and member of the Legislative Council of Ceylon
Henry D. Gilpin (1801-1860), 14th Attorney General of the United States
Henry Goonesekera, Sri Lankan Sinhala politician, member of the 2nd State Council of Ceylon
Henry Goulburn (1784–1856), British Conservative statesman and a member of the Peelite faction after 1846
Henry Schell Hagert (1826-1885), District attorney for Philadelphia
James Henry Hammond (1807–1864), 60th governor of South Carolina
Henry Harcourt (1873–1933), British politician
Henry Kotelawala, Sri Lankan Sinhala politician
Henry Lamm (1846–1926), justice of the Supreme Court of Missouri
Henry McMaster (born 1947), American politician
Henry Morgan (1635–1688), Welsh pirate, privateer, slaveholder, and Lieutenant Governor of Jamaica, one of the principal commanders of the Anglo-Spanish War (1654–1660)
Henry Paulson, American banker who served as the 74th United States Secretary of the Treasury from 2006 to 2009
Henry Peiris (1910-1959), Sri Lankan Sinhala Marxist politician
Henry Pelham-Clinton, 5th Duke of Newcastle, British politician and Secretary of State for War and the Colonies
Henry Petty-Fitzmaurice, 5th Marquess of Lansdowne, British statesman who served successively as the fifth Governor General of Canada, Viceroy of India, Secretary of State for War, and Secretary of State for Foreign Affairs
Henry Phipps, 1st Earl of Mulgrave, British politician and Secretary of State for Foreign and Commonwealth Affairs
Henry Pollock, English barrister who became a prominent politician in Hong Kong, the attorney general of Hong Kong
Henry Riggs Rathbone (1870–1928), congressman from Illinois
Henry Thambiah (1906–1997), Sri Lankan Tamil academic, judge, and diplomat
Henry Lorensz Wendt (1858-1911), Sri Lankan Burgher lawyer, judge, and legislator

Film
Henry, Indian producer
Henry Cavill (born 1983), British actor
Henry Czerny, Canadian film, stage, and television actor
Henry Daniell (1894–1963), English actor
Henry Fonda (1905–1982), American actor
Henry Golding (born 1987), British Malaysian actor
Henry Hathaway (1898–1985), American film director
Henry Hunter Hall (born 1997), American actor
Henry Jayasena (1931–2009), Sri Lankan actor in cinema, television, and theater
Henry King (1886–1982), American actor and film director
Henry Koster (1905–1988), German-American film director
Henry Roxby Beverley (1790–1863), English actor
Henry Selick (born 1952), American stop-motion film director
Henry B. Walthall (1878–1936), American actor
Henry Winkler (born 1945), American actor and producer

Music
Henry Jackman (born 1974), English composer
Henry John Deutschendorf Jr (1943-1997) known professionally as John Denver, American singer
Henry Krtschil (1932–2020), German composer
Henry Lau (born 1989), Canadian singer, musician, and actor
Henry Mancini (1924–1994), American composer
Henry Purcell (1659–1695), English composer
Henry Rollins (born 1961), American singer
Henry Samuel (born 1963), British singer-songwriter known professionally as Seal

Scientists
W. Henry Bragg, British physicist, chemist, mathematician, and active sportsman
Henry Fox Talbot (1800–1877), English scientist, inventor, and photography pioneer
Henry Parker Sartwell (1792–1867), American botanist

Businessmen
Henry Bizot (1901–1990), French banker and first chairman of the Banque Nationale de Paris
Henry Cheng (born 1946), Hong Kong billionaire property developer
Henry Flagler (1830–1913), American tycoon, real estate promoter, and railroad developer, known as the father of Miami, Florida
Henry Fok (1923–2006), Hong Kong businessman
Henry Ford (1863–1947), American inventor, industrialist, father of the modern assembly line, and founder of Ford Motor Company
Henry Givens Burgess, Irish railway executive and politician
Henry J. Heinz, German entrepreneur and founder of Heinz Ketchup company
H. F. S. Morgan (1881–1959), English sports car manufacturer and founder and chairman of the Morgan Motor Company
Henry Sy (1924–2019), Chinese-Filipino billionaire, business magnate, investor, and philanthropist

Explorers
Henry Hudson (born c. 1560s/70s), English sea explorer
Prince Henry the Navigator (1394–1460), responsible for the early development of European exploration and maritime trade with other continents

Literary figures
Ralph Henry Barbour, American novelist
Henry G. Brinton (born 1960), American author and pastor, a contributor to the Washington Post and USA Today
Henry James (1843–1916), American author
Henry Charles Lea (1825-1909), American historian
Henry Wadsworth Longfellow (1807–1882), American poet
Henry Miller (1891–1980), American writer
Henry David Thoreau (1817–1862), American author

Criminals
Henry Lee Lucas, American serial killer

Artists
Henry Ward Ranger (1858–1916), American artist
John Henry Lorimer, Scottish painter
Henry Moore (1898–1986), English sculptor and artist
Henry Orth (1866–1946), American architect
Henry Parayre (1879–1970), French sculptor
Henry Payne, British stained glass artist, watercolourist and painter of frescoes
Henry Richardson (born 1961), American sculptor
Henry Strater (1896–1987) American painter, and illustrator
Henry Ossawa Tanner, American artist and the first African-American painter to gain international acclaim

Sportsmen
Henry "Hank" Aaron (1934–2021), American baseball player
Henry Austin (baseball) (1844–1904), American baseball player
Henry Adrian Austin (born 1972), Barbadian cricketer
Henry Fitzherbert Austin (1874–1957), Barbadian cricketer
Henry Bibby (born 1949), American basketball player
Henry Cárdenas (born 1965), Colombian road cyclist
Henry Cejudo (born 1987), American mixed martial artist and UFC Flyweight Champion
Henry Collins (boxer) (born 1977), Australian boxer
Henry Cooper (1934–2011), British boxer, British, European and Commonwealth heavyweight champion in 1970
Henry Duhamel (1853–1917), French mountaineer, author, and skiing pioneer
Henry Louis "Lou" Gehrig (1903–1941), American baseball player nicknamed "The Iron Horse" 
Hank Greenberg (1911–1986), American hall of fame baseball player
Henry Hynoski (born 1988), American football player
Henry Hynoski Sr. (born 1953), American football player
Henry Marsh (athlete) (born 1954), American long-distance runner
Henry Maske (born 1964), German boxer 
Henry Menzies (1867–1938), Scottish rugby union player
Henry Mondeaux (born 1995), American football player
Henry Obst (1906–1975), American football player
Henry Orth (American football) (1897–1980), American football player
Henry Prusoff (1912–1943), American professional tennis player
Henry Ruggs (born 1999), American football player
Henry Schichtle (born 1941), American football player
Henry Speight (born 1988), Australian rugby union player
Henry Surtees (1991–2009), British racing driver
Henry Sugut (born 1985), Kenyan long-distance runner
Henry To'oTo'o (born 2001), American football player

Others
Henry Allingham (1896–2009), briefly the world's oldest man
H. Parrott Bacot (born Henry Parrott Bacot; 1941–2020), art historian and museum director
Henry Adams Bellows, newspaper editor and radio executive
Henry Engelbert (1826–1901), German-American architect
Henry Louis Gates Jr., American literary critic, professor, historian, filmmaker, and public intellectual who serves as the Alphonse Fletcher University Professor and Director of the Hutchins Center for African and African American Research at Harvard University
Henry Alfred Ian Goonetilleke, Sri Lankan Sinhala library director at the University of Peradeniya and scholar
Henry Wilson Hodge (1865-1919), American civil engineer
Henry Kelly (born 1946), Irish television presenter and radio DJ
Henry George, American political economist and journalist
Henry Goddard Leach (1880–1970), American Scandinavian studies scholar
Henry Mayhew, English social researcher, journalist, playwright, and reform advocate
Henry More, English philosopher of the Cambridge Platonist school
Henry Newman, British political adviser
Henry Omaga-Diaz (born 1961), Filipino journalist, news anchor, and radio newscaster
Henry F. Pulitzer (1899–1979), Austrian-born publisher and art collector
Henry Winthrop Sargent (1810–1882), American horticulturist

Fictional characters
 Henry of Skalitz, the main protagonist from the medieval open-world videogame Kingdom Come: Deliverance
 Henry, a green lizard character from the 1996 animated TV series Amazing Animals
 Henry Branwell, a character from The Infernal Devices, part of The Shadowhunter Chronicles by Cassandra Clare
Henery Hawk, Warner Bros. Looney Tunes character
 Henry and Orville, the second pair of ghosts who Luigi encounters in Luigi's Mansion
 Henry, a character from the television show KaBlam!
 Henry, a character from the animated series Oswald
 Henry, a persona or character from John Berryman's The Dream Songs
 Henry, a playable dark mage in the 2012 game Fire Emblem Awakening
 Henry, the main protagonist of the 2015 film Hardcore Henry
Henry, a character from the 2008 video game No More Heroes
Henry the Octopus, a character from The Wiggles
Henry (comic), a comic character that began in 1932
Henry the Green Engine, a steam locomotive from The Railway Series of books by Reverend W. Awdry
Henry I, another character from the television series Once Upon a Time
Uncle Henry, character from the Oz books by L. Frank Baum
Horrid Henry, fictional character from the eponymous children's comedy television show
 Henry Baker, a character from the 2003 film Cheaper by the Dozen and its sequel
 Henry Bennett, the main character in American author Mark Twain's 1889 novel A Connecticut Yankee in King Arthur's Court
Lt. Col. Henry Braymore Blake, a character in the M*A*S*H novels, film, and television series
 Henry Bowers, a character from Stephen King's novel It
 Henry Deaver, protagonist of the Castle Rock television series inspired by the Stephen King novels
 Henry Desmond, a character in the American television sitcom Bosom Buddies
 Henry Clerval, character from Frankenstein by Mary Shelley
 Henry Crabbe, main character of the series Pie in the Sky
 Henry Creel, main antagonist of Netflix Sci-fi drama series Stranger Things
Henry Deacon, fictional character from the television series Eureka
 Henry "Hank" Daughtry, fictional character from the video game Infamous Second Son
 Henry Emily, a major character and the creator/owner of Freddy Fazbears Pizzeria in the Five Nights at Freddy's horror game franchise
 Henry Francis, a character from the American television series Mad Men
 Henry Forman, a character from Marvin Marvin
 Henry Gupta, character from the James Bond film Tomorrow Never Dies
 Henry Hart, a character from Henry Danger
 Henry Higgins, a major character in George Bernard Shaw's play Pygmalion and also in the musical adaptation My Fair Lady
Henry Huggins, a character created by Beverly Cleary
 Henry Hugglemonster, a character from Henry Hugglemonster
 Henry Jekyll, title character in the Robert Louis Stevenson novel The Strange Case of Dr. Jekyll and Mr. Hyde
 Henry/Hank Jennings, a character from the television series Twin Peaks
 Dr. Henry Walton Jones, Jr. (Indiana Jones), the title character and the protagonist of the Indiana Jones franchise
 Henry Keddys, minor character in Chris Lilley's mockumentary series Angry Boys
 Henry Legolant, a character from the anime Black Clover
 Henry "Hank" MacDougall (played by Fred Willard), the pious father-in-law of Robert Barone, from the sitcom Everybody Loves Raymond
 Dr. Henry McCord, character from the television series Madam Secretary
Henry Mills, a primary character from the television series Once Upon a Time
Henry "Hank" Moody, protagonist of the Showtime television series Californication
 Henry F. Potter, the main villain from It's a Wonderful Life
Henry Pym (a.k.a. Ant Man, Giant Man, Goliath, and Yellowjacket), fictional comic book superhero in the Marvel Universe
Henry Rearden, steelmaker from the Ayn Rand book Atlas Shrugged
Henry Townshend, main protagonist in the video game Silent Hill 4
Mr. Henry J. Waternoose III, a company president, CEO, character and the secondary main antagonist voiced by James Coburn in the 2001 Disney/Pixar animated film Monsters, Inc.
Henry "Hank" Voight, a main character from the television series Chicago P.D.
 Lord Henry Wotton, character from The Picture of Dorian Gray by Oscar Wilde
 Henry Rush, the main character played by Ted Knight in the American sitcom television series Too Close for Comfort
 Henry Shoop, a character in the 1990 American action comedy movie Kindergarten Cop
 Henry Sikorsky, a character played by Christopher Lloyd in the 1989 American comedy movie The Dream Team
 Henry Stein, the main protagonist of Bendy and the Ink Machine
 Henry Tomasino, soldato from the Clemente crime family and secondary character from Mafia II and Mafia II Mobile, part of the Mafia (series)
 Henry Warnimont, a character in the television sitcom Punky Brewster
 Henry "Hank" Zipzer, character from the television series Hank Zipzer

Other uses
Military Order of St. Henry
Henry (unit), the SI unit of inductance
Henry's law, which describes the distribution of a chemical between the gas and the liquid phase
Henry (vacuum), flagship vacuum cleaner manufactured by Numatic International Limited
Henry the Hexapus, a six-legged octopus found by British marine scientists in 2008
Henry Repeating Arms, American firearms company founded in 1996

Names with a similar meaning
The names second element, *Rīk, can also be found in names:
Alaric, Amalric, Frederick / Friedrich, Eric, Patrick, Richard, Roderick

Other names also meaning "ruler", "power", "king", "lord":
Donald 
Waldemar / Vladimir 
Walter / Walther
Valentine / Valentin / Valentino / Valentinian 
Kaan / Khan
Raja
Rakesh

See also
Henry (disambiguation)
Henry (surname)

Notes

English-language masculine given names
English masculine given names
Masculine given names